The Tomb of İsa Sofi is an early 14th century tomb located in Borcak, Söğüt in the district of Bilecik, Turkey. The tomb contains "shamanic" decorations of Gök Tanrı (sky god), related to Central Asian Turkish beliefs—the first such decorations found in Anatolia. The tomb was dedicated to İsa Sofi, a friend of Ertuğrul, father of Osman Gazi (Osman I), founder of the dynasty that ruled the Ottoman Empire. İsa Sofi had a lodge in the area at the time of Osman I.

It is similar architecturally to the tombs of Gülruh Sultan and Gülşah Hatun in Bursa.

Decorations 
The decorations, which are in good condition, were discovered during the tomb's renovation, revealed when plaster was scraped away. The decorations of the tomb bear no Islamic imagery, and they are unlike those of any other tomb in Turkey.

The tomb contains no Islamic elements except for its orientation.

Use 
Up until recently, the site continued to have social and religious importance for the village, serving as a local pilgrimage site and location for Hıdırellez celebrations.

References 

History of the Ottoman Empire
Tombs in Turkey
Turkish culture
Religion in Turkey
14th century in Asia
Islamic architecture
Tengriism